Zefreh or Zafreh may refer to:
 Zefreh, Isfahan
 Zafreh, Falavarjan, Isfahan Province
 Zefreh Rural District, in Isfahan County